André Audinet (13 May 1898 – 18 April 1948) was a French middle-distance runner. He competed in the 1500 m athletic event at the 1920 Summer Olympics and placed sixth.

References

External links
 

1898 births
1948 deaths
French male middle-distance runners
Athletes (track and field) at the 1920 Summer Olympics
Olympic athletes of France